Schloss Feistritz is a castle north of Ilz in Styria, Austria. Schloss Feistritz is situated at an elevation of 304 meters.

See also
List of castles in Austria

References

This article was initially translated from the German Wikipedia.

Castles in Styria